Shirin and Farhad (Persian title: Shirin-o-Farhad- )  is a 1934 Iranian romance film directed by Abdolhossein Sepanta and produced by Ardeshir Irani's Imperial Films of Bombay; starring Sepanta, Fakhrozzaman Jabbar Vaziri, Iran Daftari and Roohangiz Saminejad.

References

1934 films
Films directed by Abdolhossein Sepanta
1934 romantic drama films
1930s Persian-language films
Iranian black-and-white films
Iranian historical films
1930s historical romance films
Iranian romantic drama films